Samuel R. Caldwell (February 11, 1880 – June 24, 1941) was one of the first people convicted and sentenced to prison for not paying his marijuana tax cannabis under the Marijuana Tax Act of 1937, according to federal files.

Biography
Samuel Caldwell was born on February 11, 1880. He was arrested on October 2, 1937, one day after the Marijuana Tax Act went into effect. He was released from prison in 1940. Caldwell died on June 24, 1941.

References

1880 births
1941 deaths
Marihuana Tax Act of 1937
American cannabis traffickers
Cannabis in Colorado